The Detroit Panthers are an American minor-league basketball team in the Premier Basketball League. Formerly a member of the American Basketball Association, the team was previously known as the Detroit Dogs and the Detroit Wheels. The Panthers were one of the charter franchises of the ABA and won the league's first championship as the Detroit Dogs.

History

2000–2002: Detroit Dogs
Initially founded in 2000 as one of the new ABA's charter franchises, the Detroit Dogs quickly became one of the league's better teams. Their first coach was Detroit's own George Gervin, a star with the original ABA in the 1970s. The Dogs finished with a 24–20 record and the best record in the Eastern Division, facing the Tampa Bay ThunderDawgs in the first round of the playoffs. After trailing for most of the game, Detroit rallied and won 117–112, moving to the second round. In the semifinals, Detroit handled the Indiana Legends 119–105, and advanced to the new ABA's first championship game against the heavily favored Chicago Skyliners, owners of a 31–12 record. Detroit would get off to a fast start and easily defeat the Skyliners, 107–91. Gee Gervin (George's son), who led the team during the regular season, won the first-ever ABA Championship Game MVP Award.

During their second season, 2001–02, the Detroit Dogs struggled as a team, losing five games in a row at one point. A late-season rally gave the Dogs an 11–17 record, good enough for fourth place and a playoff spot. The Phoenix Eclipse promptly eliminated Detroit, 112–97.

2003–2006: Detroit Wheels
For the 2002–03 season, the ABA took the year off, but returned in the 2003–04 season. In an effort to rebrand themselves, the Detroit Dogs renamed themselves the Detroit Wheels, as a reference to the car-building industry that made the city famous. The Wheels struggled both on and off the court, with several games cancelled due to an inability to secure arena dates (a common problem in the ABA). Detroit managed to play just 12 games and finished with a losing record at 4–8. In 2004–05, they finished with the same record, missing the playoffs for two consecutive years.

In 2005–2006, the "wheels" officially came off for Detroit, as they endured the worst season in their history, thanks to various injuries to key players. A long losing streak deposited the Wheels into last place in the Freddie Lewis Division with a 6–17 record. After another losing season and no playoffs, the Wheels were ready to reinvent themselves yet again.

2006–2007: Detroit Panthers
As the Detroit Panthers, the team turned things around as they went on a six-game winning streak during the 2006–07 regular season. The Panthers, led by 6'6" guard, Tyrone Mack, finished with a 16–10 record, taking the North Division title, and gearing up for a championship run. In the playoffs, they were slated to face the Peoria Kings in Detroit on March 14, 2007. In a press release, the league stated that Detroit was one of five teams that qualified for the playoffs but chose not to compete for what league CEO Joe Newman called "valid acceptable reasons.
The "Detroit Panthers" official Disc Jockey was Chip Pepitone, better known as "DJ Gemini"

2007: Off year
After giving up their playoff season, the Detroit Panthers suspended operations for the 2007–08 season, and eventually dropped out of the ABA

2008–2009: Going to the PBL
In the spring of 2008, the team joined the Premier Basketball League for the 2009 season.  The Panthers went 6–14.  In October 2009, the Panthers announced they'd be sitting out the 2010 PBL season. They would not return.

Returning to the PBL
In February of 2021, under new ownership of  Cecil L. Hood, the Panthers joined the Pro Basketball Association. In fall of 2021 the team rejoined the Premier Basketball League for the 2022 season.

Season-by-season records

ABA
 2000–2001: 24–20, W 1st rd. Tampa Bay 117–112, W 2nd rd. Indiana 119–105, W Finals Chicago 107–91
 2001–2002: 11–17, L 1st round Phoenix 112–97
 2002–2003: did not play
 2003–2004: 4–8, missed playoffs
 2004–2005: 4–8, missed playoffs
 2005–2006: 6–17, missed playoffs
 2006–2007: 16–10, did not participate in playoffs
 2007–2008: did not play

PBL
 2008–2009: 6–14

Final roster
Head Coach: Terry Sare

2009 season schedule

* Both Wilmington and Detroit need to make up a game, so Detroit is home for the game although it will be played very near Wilmington's home gym.

References

External links
Official website

Former Premier Basketball League teams
Basketball teams in Detroit
Basketball teams established in 2000
Defunct American Basketball Association (2000–present) teams